The Martyrdom of Saint Thomas is an oil on canvas painting, painted by Peter Paul Rubens in the years 1637-1638. It depicts St. Thomas the Apostle's martyrdom in Chennai, India on 3 July in 72 CE and was painted for the altar of the Augustinian church in Prague, St. Thomas's Church. The Martyrdom of Thomas is notable for Rubens's erroneous use of classical architecture to depict an Indian building in the background of the image and his fantastical depiction of a Hindu god. This painting is now in the collection of the Národní Gallery in Prague.

Further reading 

 Barbara Uppenkamp, "'Indian' Motifs in Peter Paul Rubens's The Martyrdom of Saint. Thomas and the Miracles of Saint Francis Xavier," in Nederlandsch kunsthistorisch jaarboek, 66 (2016), pg. 112-141.

References 

Paintings by Peter Paul Rubens
1638 paintings